Diloxis is a monotypic snout moth genus. It was described by George Hampson in 1897, and contains the species Diloxis ochriplaga. It is found in the Brazilian state of Rio de Janeiro.

References

Chrysauginae
Monotypic moth genera
Moths of South America
Pyralidae genera